Anders Jonny Ferm (20 February 1938 – 1 October 2019) was a Swedish diplomat and social democratic politician. Ferm was an important adviser to Prime Minister Olof Palme, and was Sweden's UN-ambassador from 1982 to 1988 and later its ambassador to Denmark.

References 

1938 births
2019 deaths
Swedish Social Democratic Party politicians
Permanent Representatives of Sweden to the United Nations
Ambassadors of Sweden to Denmark